Lyubov Yegorovna Zhigalova (15 March 1924 – 13 February 1978) was a Russian diver. She competed in the 3 m springboard and 10 m platform at the 1952 and 1956 Summer Olympics, respectively, and finished in sixth place in both events. She won a bronze medal in the springboard at the 1954 European Aquatics Championships.  She won seven national titles, in the springboard (1947, 1950, 1951, 1953 and 1954) and platform (1950, 1951). Her husband, Aleksey Zhigalov, also competed in the springboard at the 1952 Olympics.

References

External links
Biography of Lyubov Zhigalova 

1924 births
1978 deaths
Olympic divers of the Soviet Union
Divers at the 1952 Summer Olympics
Divers at the 1956 Summer Olympics
Soviet female divers